Heiko Reinemer (born 14 June 1945) is a German gymnast. He competed in eight events at the 1968 Summer Olympics.

References

1945 births
Living people
German male artistic gymnasts
Olympic gymnasts of West Germany
Gymnasts at the 1968 Summer Olympics
Sportspeople from Wiesbaden